Dingpu station is a subway station of Taipei Metro. This station is a 2 km extension to and the western terminus of the Bannan line. Dingpu station is located in Tucheng District, New Taipei City.

Construction began in January 2010 and commercial service was scheduled to begin in 2013. Commercial service was scheduled to begin in 2014, but was pushed back to 6 July 2015. It will be the eastern terminus for the New Taipei Metro Sanying line in 2025.

Station layout

The four-level, underground station with island platforms. It is 292 meters in length and 21 meters in width, and it has adopted the cut-and-cover method for construction. Four exits are built. It is located beneath Lane 118 and 52 on Zhongyang Rd.

It is currently the southernmost station in the Taipei Metro. It is a planned transfer station with the Sanying Line (as an elevated station).

Design
Station design takes into account Tucheng's early coal industry (Haishan Coal Mine area), Army Logistics School, high-tech carbon nanotubes, and ceramics made in Yingge.

History
The station was expected to be completed in December 2014 but instead was completed in May 2014. It was also expected to open for revenue service in June 2015, but has been pushed back to July 2015. It takes 30 minutes to travel from Dingpu station to Taipei Main Station.

References

External links
Dingpu Station

Bannan line stations